An Instance of the Fingerpost is a 1997 historical mystery novel by Iain Pears.

Synopsis

A murder in 17th-century Oxford is related from the contradictory points of view of four of the characters, all of them unreliable narrators. The setting of the novel is 1663, just after the restoration of the monarchy following the English Civil War, when the authority of King Charles II is not yet settled, and conspiracies abound.

Most of the characters are historical figures. Two of the narrators are the mathematician John Wallis and the historian Anthony Wood. Other characters include the philosopher John Locke, the scientists Robert Boyle and Richard Lower, spymaster John Thurloe, inventor Samuel Morland and the Anglican cleric Thomas Ken, who was later Bishop of Bath and Wells. The plot is at first centred on the death of Robert Grove but later takes in the conspiracies of John Mordaunt and William Compton (of Compton Wynyates), and the politics of Henry Bennet and Lord Clarendon. Furthermore, the characters that are fictional are nonetheless drawn from real events. The story of Sarah Blundy incorporates that of Anne Greene, while Jack Prestcott is involved in events based on the life of Richard Willis (of the Sealed Knot).

The accounts are written  in the form of memoirs by each narrator many years after the events they describe, after Thomas Ken gained his Bishopric but before the death of Henry Bennet. This dates them to 1685, the last year of Charles' reign.

A contrast portrayed in the novel is, on one hand, a philosophy based on ancient and medieval learning, and, on the other, the scientific method that was beginning to be applied in physics, chemistry and medicine.

While much of the plot is laid in a concrete, historically accurate 17th Century background, the book has a considerable fantasy element - based on the assumption that in every generation Jesus Christ is born again, and in each incarnation is doomed to be martyred again and then again come back to life, and soon disappear - to be reborn again in the next generation. In the 17th Century depicted in the book, Jesus is reincarnated as a woman; this character has an important role in the plot from the start, but only gradually is the reader made aware of her being the reincarnated Jesus.

The title

The four parts of the novel are preceded by Epigraphs taken from Francis Bacon's Novum Organum. The first three quotations describe three of Bacon's four Idols of the mind. The fourth quotation is the source of the title. The quotation is much abbreviated, with no ellipses showing the omissions. The full text (using a slightly different translation to the book) is as follows:
Among Prerogative Instances I will put in the fourteenth place Instances of the Fingerpost, borrowing the term from the fingerposts which are set up where roads part, to indicate the several directions. These I also call Decisive and Judicial, and in some cases, Oracular and Commanding Instances. I explain them thus. When in the investigation of any nature the understanding is so balanced as to be uncertain to which of two or more natures the cause of the nature in question should be assigned on account of the frequent and ordinary concurrence of many natures, instances of the fingerpost show the union of one of the natures with the nature in question to be sure and indissoluble, of the other to be varied and separable; and thus the question is decided, and the former nature is admitted as the cause, while the latter is dismissed and rejected. Such instances afford very great light and are of high authority, the course of interpretation sometimes ending in them and being completed. Sometimes these instances of the fingerpost meet us accidentally among those already noticed, but for the most part they are new, and are expressly and designedly sought for and applied, and discovered only by earnest and active diligence.

The term "fingerpost" is also an obscure synonym for prelate or priest, foreshadowing one of the book's main plot points.

In the original Latin, the term "fingerpost" is simply "cross" (crucis), echoing the decisive "crucifixion" revealed in the story:

Inter praerogativas instantiarum, ponemus loco decimo quarto Instantias Crucis; translato vocabulo a Crucibus, quae erectae in biviis indicant et signant viarum separationes. ...

Francis Bacon, Novum Organum, Book Two, "Aphorisms", Section XXXVI.

See also

The Siege of CandiaAn Experiment on a Bird in the Air Pump''
 Also compare: Ann Lee 
 Rashomon effect

References

1997 British novels
English novels
British mystery novels
British historical novels
Fiction with unreliable narrators
Epistolary novels
Fiction set in 1663
Novels set in Oxford
Jonathan Cape books
Historical mystery novels